John Figdor is a former Humanist Chaplain at Stanford University  where he organizes events and programs for both students and community members of the San Francisco Bay Area. He is the first Humanist Chaplain on the West Coast serving a university community. As a Humanist officiant he also oversees non-theistic weddings, funerals, and baby-naming ceremonies.

Early life and education
Figdor received his B.A. with honors in Philosophy from Vassar College  and he holds a master's degree (M.Div.) in Humanism and Interfaith Dialogue from Harvard Divinity School.

Career

Humanism at Stanford University 
The Humanist Community at Stanford includes humanists, atheists, and agnostics, who believe in values such as reason, science, pluralism, compassion, empathy, and altruism.  The organization holds a variety of different events, from dinners, to public lectures, to art gallery tours, to pub nights, to discussions and debates, and game nights. Previous notable speakers have included Richard Dawkins.

The Stanford Humanist Community played an essential role in the creation of Darwin Day. The first celebration of the event took place on April 22, 1995, and included a lecture given by famed anthropologist Dr. Donald Johanson to over 600 attendees.

Humanism at Harvard 
Figdor was an Organizing Fellow of the Humanist Chaplaincy at Harvard University  and former Assistant Humanist Chaplain at Harvard, working with Greg Epstein.

In 2014, Figdor coauthored, together with Lex Bayer, the book Atheist Mind, Humanist Heart: Rewriting the Ten Commandments for the Twenty-First Century (Rowman & Littlefield, 2014) and organized the Rethink Prize: a crowdsourcing competition to rethink the Ten Commandments. The contest drew more than 2,800 submissions from 18 countries and 27 U.S. states. Winners were selected by a panel of judges.

Figdor is a former Board Member of the Secular Student Alliance.  Figdor and his work have been featured in the San Francisco Chronicle, the Huffington Post, the Washington Post., Salon, CNN, and TIME.

References 

Year of birth missing (living people)
Living people
University and college chaplains in America
Harvard Divinity School alumni
American humanists
American atheists
American skeptics
Vassar College alumni
Secular humanists